Kae is not a village, but the beach of Michamvi village on the Tanzanian island of Unguja, part of Zanzibar. It is one of two villages located in the east of the island at the northern tip of Michamvi Peninsula. It lies on the shore of Chwaka Bay, immediately to the west of the village of Pingwe.

References
Finke, J. (2006) The Rough Guide to Zanzibar (2nd edition). New York: Rough Guides.

Villages in Zanzibar